Pleurobema bournianum, the Scioto pigtoe, was a species of freshwater mussel, an aquatic bivalve mollusk in the family Unionidae, the river mussels.

This species was endemic to the United States. Its natural habitat was rivers.

References

bournianum
Bivalves described in 1840
Taxonomy articles created by Polbot